Mount Barbour is a  summit located in the Pemberton Valley of British Columbia, Canada.

Description

Precipitation runoff and glacial meltwater from the mountain's north slope drains into Tenquille Creek and the south slope drains to Owl Creek, both of which are tributaries of the Birkenhead River, whereas the west slope drains to the Lillooet River via Gingerbread Creek.

Etymology
The mountain is named after Charles Barbour (died July 1, 1940), Pemberton pioneer and partner with Alex McLeod in development of the Gold King and Crown groups of mining claims south of Tenquille Creek during the pre-World War I era. The correct spelling of mountain's toponym was officially adopted November 17, 1981, by the Geographical Names Board of Canada. The toponym had been misspelled "Barber" going back to 1916.

Climate
Based on the Köppen climate classification, Mount Barbour is located in a subarctic climate zone of western North America. Most weather fronts originate in the Pacific Ocean, and travel east toward the Coast Mountains where they are forced upward by the range (Orographic lift), causing them to drop their moisture in the form of rain or snowfall. As a result, the Coast Mountains experience high precipitation, especially during the winter months in the form of snowfall. Winter temperatures can drop below −20 °C with wind chill factors below −30 °C. This climate supports a small glacier remnant on the north slope. The months July through September offer the most favorable weather for climbing Mount Barbour.

See also
 
 Geography of British Columbia

References

External links

 Weather: Mount Barbour
 Charles Barbour (photo): Pembertonmuseum.org
 Charles Barbour biography: Squamishlibrary

Two-thousanders of British Columbia
Pacific Ranges
Lillooet Land District
Coast Mountains
Pemberton Valley
Lillooet Country